The Olympus iS-100 (aka L-10) is an autofocus 35mm single lens reflex camera with built-in 4.2× zoom lens. The lens is a multi-coated 28-120mm f4.5/5.6 lens with 11 elements in 9 groups. The autofocus is a passive CCD line sensor. The camera has a built-in flash, and of course a variety of flash and other shooting programs. Exposure is controlled electronically by a sensor behind a half-transparent mirror of the viewfinder system - multi-area metering mode and spot metering are selectable. The camera's shutter is a metal lamellae focal plane shutter with speeds up to 1/2000 sec.. With its size 123x88x110mm (closed) and its weight of 615g it is a very compact and light construction of the Olympus iS series. The camera needs two CR123 batteries.

References 

OLYMPUS | News Release: IS-200 SLR

Инструкции к фотоаппаратам Olympus - OLYMPUS IS-200. Инструкция по эксплуатации. - Версия для печати

Olympus iS-100 - Camera-wiki.org - The free camera encyclopedia

Cameras